Enayatabad may refer to:
Enayatabad, Jiroft
Enayatabad, Narmashir